The harbour launch was a type of small launch used by the Royal Navy for general duties around Royal Naval dockyards and sea ports. The first were built in the 1850s with the advent of the steam engine and were originally designated harbour service launches. From the 1890s to the 1960s they were built to the same common design, first with steam engines and later with diesel engines, by small yards contracted locally by dockyards and bases. In 1942, following the introduction of the Type Two 63 ft HSL by the Royal Air Force, Admiralty Fleet Order 1518 re-designated the harbour service launch as "Harbour Launch (Steam)" or "Harbour Launch (Diesel)", depending on the type of engine.

References

Auxiliary ships of the Royal Navy
Military boats